Primarily, Florida is a state in the United States.

Florida may also refer to:

Places

Caribbean
 Florida, Cuba, a municipality in Camaguey Province, Cuba
 Florida, Puerto Rico, a municipality of Puerto Rico
 Florida, San Lorenzo, Puerto Rico, a barrio of San Lorenzo
 Florida, Vieques, Puerto Rico, a barrio of Vieques
 Florida Afuera, Barceloneta, Puerto Rico, a barrio of Barceloneta
 Florida Adentro, Florida, Puerto Rico, a barrio of the municipality of Florida in Puerto Rico

Europe
 Florida (Barcelona Metro), a station in Barcelona, Spain
 Strata Florida Abbey, a Cistercian abbey in Ceredigion, Wales
 Strata Florida railway station, a former station in Ceredigion, Wales
 Ystrad Fflur, a hamlet in Ceredigion, Wales, also known as Strata Florida

South America

Argentina
 Florida, Buenos Aires, a neighborhood of Vicente López Partido
 Florida Street in Buenos Aires
 Florida (Buenos Aires Metro), a station in Buenos Aires

Bolivia
 Florida Province, province of the Santa Cruz Department

Brazil
 Flórida Paulista, a municipality in the state of São Paulo
 Flórida, Paraná

Chile
 Florida, Chile, a commune in the Concepción Province
 La Florida, Chile, commune in the Santiago Province

Colombia
 Florida, Valle del Cauca

Peru
 Florida District, Peru

Uruguay
 Florida Department, one of the 19 departments that form the nation of Uruguay
 Florida, Uruguay, the capital city of the Florida Department

North America

Canada
Florida, Cochrane District, in Cochrane District, Ontario
Florida, Frontenac County, in the city of Kingston, Frontenac County, Ontario

United States
 Florida, Colorado
 Florida, Indiana
 Florida, Massachusetts
 Florida, Missouri
 Florida, Montgomery County, New York
 Florida, Orange County, New York
 Florida, Ohio
 Florida City, Florida
 Florida Creek, in Missouri
 Florida Parishes, Louisiana, which came from West Florida and were not part of the Louisiana Purchase
 Florida River, in Colorado
 Florida Township, Parke County, Indiana
 Florida Township, Yellow Medicine County, Minnesota
 Florida Avenue, Washington, DC
 Lake Florida, a lake in Minnesota
 Spanish Florida (Florida as a Spanish territory)

Elsewhere
 Florida, Copán, Honduras
 Florida, Gauteng, South Africa
 Florida Islands, in the Solomon Islands in the western Pacific
 Floridablanca, Pampanga, Philippines

People
 Richard Florida (born 1957), American economist
 Florida Jayalath (1936-2007), Sri Lankan Sinhala cinema actress
 Tramar Dillard (born 1979), better known as Flo Rida, American rapper

Arts, entertainment, and media

Music

Albums
 Florida (Diplo album), 2004
 Florida (Sofia Talvik album), 2010

Songs
 "Florida", a song by Grandaddy from their 2005 EP Excerpts from the Diary of Todd Zilla
 "Florida", a song by Modest Mouse from their 2007 album We Were Dead Before the Ship Even Sank

Other uses in music
 Florida (ballet), a ballet by Marius Petipa and Cesare Pugni
 Florida breaks, a genre of electronic music

Other uses in arts, entertainment, and media
 "Florida" (30 Rock), a 2013 episode of 30 Rock
 Florida, a sardana dance by Catalan composer Joan Lamote de Grignon
 Florida Evans, the lead character on the television series Good Times

Military
 SS Florida, collided with the RMS Republic in 1909
 USS Florida, various ships of that name

Sports
 Florida Gators, athletic teams of the University of Florida
 Florida Marlins, former name of the Miami Marlins, a Major League Baseball franchise based in Miami Gardens, Florida
 Florida Panthers, National Hockey League franchise based in Sunrise, Florida

Transportation
 GV Florida Transport, a Philippine bus company
 Zastava Florida, also known as Yugo Florida and Nasr Florida 1400, a brand of car made by the Yugoslavian car manufacturer Zastava

Other uses
 Florida group, a Buenos Aires-based avant-garde literary group in the 1920s, also often referred to as the Martín Fierro group
 University of Florida

See also
 Flo Rida
 Floridia
 Floriade (Netherlands)
 La Florida (disambiguation)